Alfred Anderson may refer to:

Alfred Anderson (American football) (born 1961), former American football running back
Alfred Anderson (entrepreneur) (1888–1956), Australian butcher and entrepreneur
Alfred Anderson (pianist) (1848–1876), Australian pianist and composer
Alfred Anderson (veteran) (1896–2005), Scottish joiner and veteran of the First World War
Alf Anderson (1914–1985), baseball player
Stanley Anderson (artist) (Alfred Stanley Anderson, 1884–1966), British engraver, etcher and watercolour painter

See also
Alfred O. Andersson (1874–1950), English-born American publisher
Alf Andersen (footballer) (1891–1928), Norwegian footballer
Alf Andersen (1906–1975), Norwegian ski jumper
Alf Andersen (musician) (1928–1962), Norwegian flautist
Al Anderson (disambiguation)
Fred Anderson (disambiguation)